David R. Minge (born March 19, 1942) is an American former judge and politician. David Minge served as a judge on the Minnesota Court of Appeals from 2002 until retiring at the end of March 2012. Previously, Minge was a Democratic–Farmer–Labor Party member of the United States House of Representatives serving in the 103rd, 104th, 105th, and 106th congresses, from 1993–2001, representing Minnesota's 2nd congressional district.

Early life and education
Minge was born in Clarkfield, Minnesota and raised in Worthington, Minnesota. He graduated with a bachelor's degree from St. Olaf College and J.D. from the University of Chicago Law School.

Legal career
After earning his Juris Doctor, he moved to Minneapolis, Minnesota where he practiced law for several years. He was then offered a teaching position at the University of Wyoming Law School where he taught for seven years. David Minge then moved to Montevideo, Minnesota where he was part of a country law practice, on the school board, and actively involved in community affairs. During this time he was also a consultant to the House Judiciary Committee.

Political career
He served on the Montevideo School Board from 1989 to 1992.

Minge was sworn into the House in 1993, and he became part of the Blue Dog Coalition consisting of moderate and conservative congressional Democrats. He was a champion of the Conservation Reserve Enhancement Program (CREP), a federal-state partnership to improve water quality and protect the environment. Minge narrowly lost his campaign for a fifth term to Mark Kennedy in 2000.  After his first election to the house, Minge opened a Congressional Field Office in Windom, Minnesota at which point the Windom City Council declared March 20, 1993 as "Congressman David Minge Day".

State judicial service
In 2002, Governor Jesse Ventura appointed Minge to the Minnesota Court of Appeals from the second congressional district, the same area where he served in Congress. In 2012, he retired from active status.

Post political career
He currently serves on the board of directors of the Committee for a Responsible Federal Budget.

Personal life
He is married to Karen Aaker Minge, originally of Gaylord, Minnesota. They have two sons, Erik and Olaf, and four grandchildren (Christopher, Sonja, Kiran, and Joy).

Electoral history

Write-in and minor candidate notes:  In 1992, write-ins received 414 votes.  In 1994, write-ins received 80 votes.  In 1996, write-ins received 180 votes.  In 1998, write-ins received 385 votes.  In 2000, Constitution Party candidate Dennis A. Burda received 1,337 votes.

Papers

David Minge's congressional files are available for research use.  They include correspondence, subject files, legislative files, campaign files, press office files, photographs and video and sound recordings.

References

External links 
Minnesota Judicial Branch Judge Profile
Members of Congress Votes Database
Profile of David Minge as avid bicyclist

1942 births
Living people
American Lutherans
St. Olaf College alumni
University of Chicago Law School alumni
Minnesota Court of Appeals judges
School board members in Minnesota
American people of Norwegian descent
Democratic Party members of the United States House of Representatives from Minnesota
People from Yellow Medicine County, Minnesota
People from Worthington, Minnesota